Under The Fog is the debut album by The King Blues, originally released by Household Name Records in 2006 and later re-released on Field Records, a subsidiary of Island Records in 2008. The album spawned two singles, "Mr. Music Man" and "Come Fi Di Youth".

In 2007, 1000 limited edition 180gms hand pressed vinyl albums were released via Household Name Records/Tartan Rex. These included the bonus track "If Genghis Khan Then Why Can't I"

The 2008 re-release contained many new edits of the original tracks. The Track "Under The Fog" was renamed "We Ain't Never Done" and "Taking Over" and "The Sound of Revolt" swapped places on the track listings.

The album was originally recorded in their living room in the space of four days during June 2006. It contains a hidden track, a cover of My Boy Lollipop, made famous by the Jamaican artist Millie Small in 1964.

Track listings

2006 Household Name Records release

2007 Household Name Records/Tartan Rex Limited Edition Vinyl release

2008 Field Records re-release

References

2006 debut albums
The King Blues albums
Household Name Records albums